Topaluşağı is a village in the Sivrice District of Elazığ Province in Turkey. The village is populated by Kurds of the Herdî tribe and had a population of 81 in 2021.

The hamlets of Ambarlı, Bekirağa, Derebey, Dönerkaya, Keçiler and Varlık are attached to the village.

References

Villages in Sivrice District
Kurdish settlements in Elazığ Province